This is a list of magazines primarily marketed to men. The list has been split into subcategories according to the target audience of the magazines. This list includes mostly mainstream magazines as well as adult ones. Not included here are automobile, trains, modelbuilding periodicals and gadget magazines which happen to have a predominantly male audience.

General male audience
These publications appeal to a broad male audience. Some skew toward men's fashion, others to health. Most are marketed to a particular age and income demographic. In the US, some are marketed mainly to a specific ethnic group, such as African Americans or Mexicans.

Americas

Europe

Belgium
 Men Magazine (Since 1998)

United Kingdom
 #5 Magazine
 Buck (defunct)
 The Chap
 Esquire UK
 Lusso Magazine
 Magnate (defunct)
 Man About Town (2000s–2010s magazine)
 Men's Health UK
 Nuts (defunct)
 Sorted
 Zoo (defunct)

Others
 For Men
 Vi Menn
}}

Asia

Oceania

Ethnic men's magazines

African American men's magazines

 Black Enterprise
 King (US) (defunct)
 Smooth (US)

Latin American men's magazines

 Hombre
 Open Your Eyes (defunct)

Gay male audience

 The Advocate
 Attitude
 AXM (defunct)
 Badi
 Bear Magazine
 bent
 Blue
 Boyz
 Butt
 DNA
 fab (defunct)
 FourTwoNine
 G Magazine (defunct)
 G-Men
 Gay Times
 Genre (defunct)
 Hello Mr. (defunct)
 Instinct
 Männer
 MyKali
 Next Magazine
 Out
 Outlooks (defunct)
 QX
 Siegessäule
 Têtu
 XY
 Zero (defunct)

Men's lifestyle magazines

Men's lifestyle magazines (lad mags in the UK and specifically men's magazines  in North America) were popular in the 1990 and 2000s  focusing on a mix of "Sex, sport, gadgets and grooming tips". From the early 2000s, sales of these magazines declined very substantially as the internet provided the same content (and particularly more graphic pornography) for free.

International
 FHM 
 Maxim
 Stuff
 Zoo Weekly (defunct)

Americas

Europe

Oceania
 People (Australia) (defunct)
 Ralph (Australia)  (defunct)
 M2 Magazine (New Zealand)

See also
 List of health and fitness magazines
 List of pornographic magazines
 List of women's magazines
 Men's adventure magazine

Citations

General and cited references

External links
 Calcutt, Andrew. "Changing the Subject: from the Gentleman’s Magazine to GQ and Barack Obama", Maglab (November 2009)

Men's magazines